is a Japanese politician of the Liberal Democratic Party, a member of the House of Councillors in the Diet (national legislature). A native of Ōita, Ōita and graduate of Oita University, he had served in the city assembly of Ōita for two terms since 1973 and the assembly of Ōita Prefecture for two terms since 1979. He was elected to the House of Representatives for the first time in 1990 after an unsuccessful run in 1986. In 2000 he lost the seat but was re-elected three years later. He, however, lost the seat again in 2005. In 2007 he ran for the House of Councillors and was elected.

In 2019 Eto entered the 4th Abe cabinet as the Minister of state for Okinawa and Northern Territories Affairs.

Eto is affiliated to the openly revisionist lobby Nippon Kaigi.

References

External links 
  in Japanese.

Members of the House of Representatives (Japan)
Members of the House of Councillors (Japan)
Living people
1947 births
Members of Nippon Kaigi
People from Ōita (city)
Members of the Ōita Prefectural Assembly
Liberal Democratic Party (Japan) politicians
21st-century Japanese politicians